Slovakia women's national under-19 floorball team is the national under 19 team of Slovakia. , the team was ranked fifth by the International Floorball Federation.

References

External links
Slovak Floorball Association
Slovakia on IFF website

Women's national under-19 floorball teams
Floorball